Angela Nicole Walker (born January 19, 1974) is an American activist, professional driver, and labor organizer. Walker was the vice-presidential nominee of the Green Party of the United States and Socialist Party USA for the 2020 election alongside presidential nominee Howie Hawkins. She was previously the vice-presidential nominee of the Socialist Party USA for the 2016 election alongside presidential nominee Mimi Soltysik.

Walker ran for political office for the first time in 2014 as an independent socialist for sheriff of Milwaukee County, Wisconsin. Walker describes herself as a socialist in the tradition of Fred Hampton and Assata Shakur.

Early life
Angela Walker was born and raised in Milwaukee, Wisconsin, where she lived primarily in the inner city Northside neighborhood. Walker graduated from Bay View High School. While in high school, Walker helped organize students in support of a Black History course at Bay View, which was successful. She studied history at the University of North Florida but dropped out in her final year because she "could make more money as a bus driver than as a teacher."

Career
Walker worked for two years as a driver for Greyhound Lines. Describing her life as an "odyssey," Walker then moved to North Carolina, where she married and moved back to Florida. She moved back to Milwaukee in 2009 and was hired as a driver for the Milwaukee County Transit System. 

In 2011, she became legislative director for her local in the Amalgamated Transit Union (ATU), which represented transit system drivers; her position coincided with the rise of the anti-labor union Tea Party and the election of Scott Walker as Wisconsin's 45th Governor. Angela Walker was active in the Occupy movement, which the ATU supported. She stepped down from the legislative director position in October 2013. 

Walker worked as a bus driver for over 14 years. Walker is currently employed as a dump truck driver.

Sheriff campaign
In 2014, Walker ran against incumbent Democrat and Fox News pundit David A. Clarke Jr. During her campaign for sheriff in Milwaukee, Walker called for an end to mass incarceration, evictions, and anti-immigrant policing. She received approximately 20 percent of the vote.

Vice-presidential campaigns

2016 campaign
 
In March 2016, Walker stated that she had been recruited to be the Socialist Party USA vice-presidential nominee by her future running-mate, Mimi Soltysik, following her campaign for sheriff. Walker and Soltysik were nominated at the Socialist Party National Convention in Walker's hometown of Milwaukee, Wisconsin in October 2015. Soltysik-Walker appeared on the ballot in Colorado, Guam and Michigan as well as official write-in candidates in many other states during the general election.

2020 campaign

On May 5, 2020, Green Party presidential candidate and Socialist Party USA presidential nominee Howie Hawkins announced Walker had accepted his offer to be his running mate. On July 11, Walker was formally nominated as the Green Party's vice-presidential nominee. She was the second African-American vice-presidential nominee of the Green Party and the first from the state of South Carolina.

Personal life
Walker is a vegetarian and bisexual.

Electoral history

2014 election

2016 election

References

|-

1974 births
2016 United States vice-presidential candidates
2020 United States vice-presidential candidates
21st-century American politicians
21st-century American women politicians
Amalgamated Transit Union people
African-American people in Wisconsin politics
African-American women in politics
African-American candidates for Vice President of the United States
Bisexual politicians
Bisexual women
Candidates in the 2014 United States elections
Female candidates for Vice President of the United States
Green Party of the United States vice presidential nominees
Howie Hawkins
Trade unionists from South Carolina
Trade unionists from Wisconsin
LGBT people from South Carolina
LGBT people from Wisconsin
Living people
Politicians from Milwaukee
Socialist Party USA politicians from Wisconsin
Socialist Party USA vice presidential nominees
South Carolina Greens
University of North Florida alumni
Wisconsin socialists
Women in Wisconsin politics